Dodia diaphana is a moth of the family Erebidae. It was described by Eduard Friedrich Eversmann in 1848. It is found in Russia and Mongolia.

Subspecies
Dodia diaphana diaphana (mountains of southern Siberia, Amur, Skihote-Alin, central Yakutia, northern Mongolia)
Dodia diaphana arctica Tshistjakov, 1988 (eastern Yakutia, southern Magadan)

References

Callimorphina
Moths described in 1848